Tosale is a genus of snout moths. It was described by Francis Walker in 1859.

Species
 Tosale aucta
 Tosale austa
 Tosale cuprealis (Hampson, 1906)
 Tosale decipiens C. Felder, R. Felder & Rogenhofer, 1875
 Tosale flatalis C. Felder, R. Felder & Rogenhofer, 1875
 Tosale gladbaghiana (Stoll, 1781)
 Tosale grandis
 Tosale lugubris
 Tosale oviplagalis (Walker, 1866)
 Tosale similalis
 Tosale velutina

References

Chrysauginae
Pyralidae genera
Taxa named by Francis Walker (entomologist)